Grifo may refer to:

People 
 Grifo (noble) (726–753), Frankish noble
 Grifo di Tancredi (active 1271–1312), Italian painter
 Leonardo Grifo (died 1485), Roman Catholic prelate and Archbishop of Benevento
 Lionello Grifo (born 1934), Italian poet and writer
 Vincenzo Grifo (born 1993), Italian-German footballer

Other uses 
 Teichfuss Grifo, an Italian training glider
 Ambrosini S.1001 Grifo, an Italian light airplane
 Iso Grifo, an Italian grand tourer automobile